Marcy O'Keefe Deptuch (born November 5, 1955) is an American former professional tennis player.

O'Keefe, who grew up in California, competed on tour in the 1970s. She twice made the second round of the US Open, including in 1976 when she won her opening match over Peggy Michel. 

While attending Stanford University she played collegiate tennis and earned All-American honors in 1976.

References

External links
 

1955 births
Living people
American female tennis players
Stanford Cardinal women's tennis players
Tennis people from California